Modelland is a young adult novel written by model Tyra Banks and ghostwriter Michael Salort, published in 2011.

Plot summary 
A young, awkward-looking girl by the name of Tookie De La Crème is invited to attend the legendary boarding school Modelland for a chance to join the Intoxibellas, the most celebrated models in all the world. Along the way she meets a plus-sized girl named Dylan, a  girl named Shiraz, and an albino girl named Piper. Together they form a strong bond as they face the trials and tribulations of Modelland and endeavor to find the truth about why they were all accepted to it...and why a mysterious impostor seems to want nothing more than for them to be gone.

Reception 

Publishers Weekly considered the book "overlong", "campy and warped", and a "nonstop barrage of surrealism and wackiness", but conceded that it could serve as a guilty pleasure. The Stony Brook Press praised Banks' approach of allegorically describing the process by which contestants are selected to appear on America's Next Top Model, but criticized the book's "inner conflict of (...) purpose", and described it as "tacky, predictable and superficial" and "exhausting" to read, while the Georgia Straight called it "a befuddling piece of dreckitude" and evidence that Banks is "certifiably batty." Bitch noted that although Modelland "promotes self-esteem and confidence in girls, it is less than empowering since it is all to a depressing consumerist end", calling it "a nonsensical, nightmarish, acid trip that seemed like it would never end" with "more made-up words and terms than a Klingon translation of a Dr. Seuss book", and emphasizing that it "stops being funny when you realize just how long it is".

Inspiration 
Banks has said that the inspiration for Modelland happened one day while she was driving down on a street in New York City. She had been thinking about why supermodels are "super" and the idea of Modelland came to mind.

She wrote on her website, talking about the idea for the book:
"I’m always dreaming up ideas, like when the words “modeling boarding school” floated into my head while I was driving on the FDR highway in Manhattan. I wrote them down in a little notepad and, five years, thousands of pages and dozens of writing getaways later, I finally get to call myself the author of Modelland."

References in Other Media 
In America's Next Top Model (season 17), Banks instructs the four remaining contestants in episode "Tyson Beckford" to perform as characters in the novel, in a short film based on the book, with part 1 of the film broadcast in that episode, part 2 was broadcast in the season finale.

In May 2021, Conor Lastowka and Michael J. Nelson selected this as their next book for analysis on the podcast 372 Pages We'll Never Get Back, a podcast dedicated to books the hosts do not expect to like.

Sequel 
Modelland is the first installment of a proposed trilogy. However, no news has come out about a sequel.

References

External links 

Modelland website at Random House Teens

2011 American novels
American young adult novels
Young adult fantasy novels
Delacorte Press books